Sofía Calero Diaz is a Spanish chemist who is a professor and Vice Dean of the Department of Applied Physics at the Eindhoven University of Technology. Her research considers computational modelling of functional materials for applications in renewable energy. She was awarded the Spanish Royal Society of Chemistry Award for Scientific Excellence in 2018.

Early life and education 
Calero was born in Spain. She attended the Complutense University of Madrid and remained there for her doctoral research, which considered the thermodynamic properties of liquids of complex molecules. She moved to the University of Amsterdam as a Marie Curie Fellow.

Research and career 
Calero moved to the Pablo de Olavide University (UPO) in 2003, where she was named a Ramon y Cajal Fellow, and established a group who studied nanomaterials for applications in technologies. She was part of the European Cooperation in Science and Technology (COST) action on Computational materials sciences for efficient water splitting with nanocrystals from abundant elements. The programme looked to developed highly efficient energy converting devices (e.g. electrochemical cells for water-splitting). Calero was responsible for the development of Monte Carlo simulations of the project, and contributed to the software RASPA. RASPA is a simulation package that allows the study of adsorption and diffusion in nanoporous systems.

Calero moved to the Eindhoven University of Technology in 2020. She was made Vice Dean of the Department of Applied Physics. She focuses on the simulation of materials for renewable energies and the development of force field to predict the functional properties of materials.

Awards and honours 
 2005 Marie Curie Award for Excellence
 2011 European Research Council Consolidator Award
 2018 Spanish Royal Society of Chemistry Award for Scientific Excellence
 2020 TU/e Irene Curie Grant

Selected publications

References 

Living people
Spanish women chemists
Complutense University of Madrid alumni
Year of birth missing (living people)